Fatawa Darul Uloom Deoband is an 18-volume compilation of Islamic legal opinions, or fatwas, issued by the scholars of Darul Uloom Deoband, a prominent Islamic seminary in India. The fatwas cover a wide range of topics, including faith, prayer, fasting, charity, pilgrimage, marriage, divorce, and more. The collection is considered a comprehensive guide to Islamic jurisprudence, and has been cited by scholars and academics around the world as a reliable source for religious verdicts on social, economic, political, and moral issues. The compilation process began in the early 20th century, with the first phase of fatwas being compiled by Muhammad Shafi Deobandi in 1938 and published as Aziz al-Fatawa. The second phase of compilation began in the 1970s under the direction of Zafeeruddin Miftahi, who organized the fatwas into 12 volumes according to fiqhi order. The third phase began in 2005 and included six more volumes, with Muhammad Amin Palanpuri adding to the collection.

Background 
Darul Uloom Deoband has been issuing religious fatwas (legal opinions) to Muslims since its inception. Initially, the responsibility was entrusted to learned teachers such as Yaqub Nanautawi, who were assisted by other teachers and students. However, with the increasing number of queries, a separate department called Darul Ifta was established in 1892, with Aziz-ul-Rahman Usmani as its first Mufti. He served for 34 years and wrote an estimated 118,000 fatwas, all of which were copied by scribes into registers and preserved for future reference.

The fatwas of Aziz-ul-Rahman Usmani were compiled in different phases, with Muhammad Shafi Deobandi and Zafeeruddin Miftahi taking up the task in the first and second phases, respectively. The latter compiled a total of 12 volumes in fiqhi order, which are known as Fatawa Darul Uloom Deoband. In the third phase, Muhammad Amin Palanpuri added six more volumes to the collection, making a total of 18. This complete collection includes only selected fatwas issued by Aziz-ul-Rahman Usmani and is also known as Fatawa Darul Uloom Deoband.

Reception 
In 1951, Abul Kalam Azad, the first Indian Minister of Education, visited the Darul Uloom Deoband. During his visit, he was greatly impressed by the vast and valuable collection of fatwas, and he expressed his admiration for it. He even remarked that this collection had the potential to produce another Fatwa-e-Tatar Khani. Azad went on to praise the madrasah's contribution to the advancement of religion, believing that such a collection could facilitate the resolution of numerous problems faced by the people. Judge Muhammad Khalid Masud of the Supreme Court of Pakistan has stated that the Fatawa Darul Uloom Deoband is an essential source for understanding the development of Islamic law in the modern age, as well as for reflecting the social, economic, and political history of South Asian Muslims.

See also 

 Deobandi fiqh

References

External links 
 Fatawa Darul Uloom Deoband

Deobandi fiqh literature
Islamic literature
Sunni literature
Hanafi literature
Darul Uloom Deoband
Urdu-language books
Books about Islamic jurisprudence
Sharia
Legal history of India
Legal codes
20th-century Indian books
Indian non-fiction books
Indian religious texts